In mathematics, near sets are either spatially close or descriptively close. Spatially close sets have nonempty intersection. In other words, spatially close sets are not disjoint sets, since they always have at least one element in common. Descriptively close sets contain elements that have matching descriptions. Such sets can be either disjoint or non-disjoint sets. Spatially near sets are also descriptively near sets.

The underlying assumption with descriptively close sets is that such sets contain elements that have location and measurable features such as colour and frequency of occurrence. The description of the element of a set is defined by a feature vector. Comparison of feature vectors provides a basis for measuring the closeness of descriptively near sets. Near set theory provides a formal basis for the observation, comparison, and classification of elements in sets based on their closeness, either spatially or descriptively. Near sets offer a framework for solving problems based on human perception that arise in areas such as image processing, computer vision as well as engineering and science problems.

Near sets have a variety of applications in areas such as topology, pattern detection and classification, abstract algebra, mathematics in computer science, and solving a variety of problems based on human perception that arise in areas such as image analysis, image processing, face recognition, ethology, as well as engineering and science problems. From the beginning, descriptively near sets have proved to be useful in applications of topology, and visual pattern recognition , spanning a broad spectrum of applications that include camouflage detection, micropaleontology, handwriting forgery detection, biomedical image analysis, content-based image retrieval, population dynamics, quotient topology, textile design, visual merchandising, and topological psychology.

As an illustration of the degree of descriptive nearness between two sets, consider an example of the Henry colour model for varying degrees of nearness
between sets of picture elements in pictures (see, e.g., §4.3). The two pairs of ovals in Fig. 1 and Fig. 2 contain coloured segments. Each segment in the figures corresponds to an equivalence class where all pixels in the class have similar descriptions, i.e., picture elements with similar colours. The ovals in Fig.1 are closer to each other descriptively than the ovals in Fig. 2.

History 
It has been observed that the simple concept of nearness unifies various concepts of topological structures inasmuch as the category Near of all nearness spaces and nearness preserving maps contains categories sTop (symmetric topological spaces and continuous maps), Prox (proximity spaces and -maps), Unif (uniform spaces and uniformly continuous maps) and Cont (contiguity spaces and contiguity maps) as embedded full subcategories. The notation  reads category  is embedded in category . Let  denote the category of all -approach nearness spaces and contractions, and let  denote the category of all -approach merotopic spaces and contractions.

Let  be extended pseudometrics on nonempty sets , respectively. The map  is a contraction if and only if  is a contraction. For nonempty subsets  , the distance function  is defined by

Then  is a contraction if and only if  is a contraction. The category  is a topological construct.

The notions of near and far in mathematics can be traced back to works by Johann Benedict Listing and Felix Hausdorff. The related notions of resemblance and similarity can be traced back to J.H. Poincaré, who introduced sets of similar sensations (nascent tolerance classes) to represent the results of G.T. Fechner's sensation sensitivity experiments and a framework for the study of resemblance in representative spaces as models of what he termed physical continua. The elements of a physical continuum (pc) are sets of sensations. The notion of a pc and various representative spaces (tactile, visual, motor spaces) were introduced by Poincaré in an 1894 article on the mathematical continuum, an 1895 article on space and geometry and a compendious 1902 book on science and hypothesis followed by a number of elaborations, e.g.,. The 1893 and 1895 articles on continua (Pt. 1, ch. II) as well as representative spaces and geometry (Pt. 2, ch IV) are included as chapters in. Later, F. Riesz introduced the concept of proximity or nearness of pairs of sets at the International Congress of Mathematicians (ICM) in 1908.

During the 1960s, E.C. Zeeman introduced tolerance spaces in modelling visual perception. A.B. Sossinsky observed in 1986 that the main idea underlying tolerance space theory comes from Poincaré, especially. In 2002, Z. Pawlak and J. Peters considered an informal approach to the perception of the nearness of physical objects such as snowflakes that was not limited to spatial nearness. In 2006, a formal approach to the descriptive nearness of objects was considered by J. Peters, A. Skowron and J. Stepaniuk in the context of proximity spaces. In 2007, descriptively near sets were introduced by J. Peters followed by the introduction of tolerance near sets. Recently, the study of descriptively near sets has led to algebraic, topological and proximity space foundations of such sets.

Nearness of sets 
The adjective near in the context of near sets is used to denote the fact that observed feature value differences of distinct objects are small enough to be
considered indistinguishable, i.e., within some tolerance.

The exact idea of closeness or 'resemblance' or of 'being within tolerance' is universal enough to appear, quite naturally, in almost any mathematical setting
(see, e.g.,). It is especially natural in mathematical applications: practical problems, more often than not, deal with approximate input data and only require viable results with a tolerable level of error.

The words near and far are used in daily life and it was an incisive suggestion of F. Riesz that these intuitive concepts be made rigorous. He introduced the concept of nearness of pairs of sets at the ICM in Rome in 1908. This concept is useful in simplifying teaching calculus and advanced calculus. For example, the passage from an intuitive definition of continuity of a function at a point to its rigorous epsilon-delta definition is sometime difficult for teachers to explain and for students to understand. Intuitively, continuity can be explained using nearness language, i.e., a function  is continuous at a point , provided points  near  go into points  near . Using Riesz's idea, this definition can be made more precise and its contrapositive is the familiar definition.

Generalization of set intersection 
From a spatial point of view, nearness (a.k.a. proximity) is considered a generalization of set intersection. For disjoint sets, a form of nearness set intersection is defined in terms of a set of objects (extracted from disjoint sets) that have similar features within some
tolerance (see, e.g., §3 in). For example, the ovals in Fig. 1 are considered near each other, since these ovals contain pairs of classes that display similar (visually indistinguishable) colours.

Efremovič proximity space 

There are many ways to define Efremovič proximities on topological spaces (discrete proximity, standard proximity, metric proximity, Čech proximity, Alexandroff proximity, and Freudenthal proximity),  For details, see § 2, pp. 93–94 in.
The focus here is on standard proximity on a topological space.  For ,  is near  (denoted by ), provided their closures share a common point.

The closure of a subset  (denoted by ) is the usual Kuratowski closure of a set, introduced in § 4, p. 20, is defined by

A standard  proximity relation is defined by

Whenever sets  and  have no points in common, the sets are farfrom each other (denoted ).

The following EF-proximity space axioms are given by Jurij Michailov Smirnov based on what Vadim Arsenyevič Efremovič introduced during the first half of the 1930s. Let .

EF.3  Two points are close, if and only if, they are the same point.
EF.4  All sets are far from the empty set .

The pair  is called an EF-proximity space. In this context, a space is a set with some added structure.

Visualization of EF-axiom 

Let the set  be represented by the points inside the rectangular region in Fig. 5. Let  (complement of the set ). Then from the EF-axiom, observe the following:

Descriptive proximity space 
Descriptively near sets were introduced as a means of solving classification and pattern recognition problems arising from disjoint sets that resemble each other.  Recently, the connections between near sets in EF-spaces and near sets in descriptive EF-proximity spaces have been explored in.

Again, let  be a metric topological space and let  a set of probe functions that represent features of each .  The assumption made here is  contains non-abstract points that have measurable features such as gradient orientation.  A non-abstract point has a location and features that can be measured (see § 3 in ).

For example, this leads to a proximal view of sets of picture points in digital images.

To obtain a descriptive proximity relation (denoted by ), one first chooses a set of probe functions. That is,

The expression  reads  is descriptively near .

Observe that  and  can be disjoint and yet  can be nonempty.

The descriptive proximity relation  is defined by

Whenever sets  and  have no points with matching descriptions, the sets are descriptively far from each other (denoted by ).

 dEF.4 All nonempty sets are descriptively far from the empty set .

The pair  is called a descriptive proximity space.

Proximal relator spaces 
A relator is a nonvoid family of relations   on a nonempty set . The pair  (also denoted ) is called a relator space. Relator spaces are natural generalizations of ordered sets and uniform spaces. For simplicity, we consider only two proximity relations, namely, the Efremovič proximity  and the descriptive proximity  in defining the descriptive relator . The pair  is called a proximal relator space. In this work,  denotes a metric topological space that is endowed with the relations in a proximal relator.

In a proximal relator space , the descriptive closure of a set  (denoted by ) is defined by

Theorem 4   Let  be a proximal relator space, .  Then .

Consequently, . Hence, 

In a proximal relator space, EF-proximity  leads to the following results for descriptive proximity .

Theorem 5 Let  be a proximal relator space, .  Then
 1° .
 2° .
 3° .

 Proof  
 1° . Consequently, .
 1° ⇒ 2°
 3°  implies that  and  have at least one point in common. Hence, 1° ⇒ 3°.

Descriptive 𝛿-neighbourhoods 

A set  has a natural strong inclusion in a set  associated with } (denoted by ), provided ; i.e.,  ( is far from the complement of ).

Let  be a descriptive -neighbourhood relation defined by

That is, provided the description of each  is contained in the set of descriptions of the points .  Now observe that any  in the proximal relator space  such that  have disjoint -neighbourhoods; i.e.,
 

 Theorem 6  Any two sets descriptively far from each other belong to disjoint descriptive -neighbourhoods in a descriptive proximity space .

A consideration of strong containment of a nonempty set in another set leads to the study of hit-and-miss topologies and the Wijsman topology.

Tolerance near sets 
Let  be a real number greater than zero.  In the study of sets that are proximally near within some tolerance, the set of proximity relations  is augmented with a pseudometric tolerance proximity relation (denoted by ) defined by

Let .  In other words, a nonempty set equipped with the proximal relator  has underlying structure provided by the proximal relator  and provides a basis for the study of tolerance near sets in  that are near within some tolerance.  Sets  in a descriptive pseudometric proximal relator space  are tolerance near sets (i.e.), provided

Tolerance classes and preclasses 
Relations with the same formal properties as similarity relations of sensations considered by Poincaré are nowadays, after Zeeman, called tolerance relations. A tolerance  on a set  is a relation  that is reflexive and symmetric.  In algebra, the term tolerance relation is also used in a narrow sense to denote reflexive and symmetric relations defined on universes of algebras that are also compatible with operations of a given algebra, i.e., they are generalizations of congruence relations (see e.g.,). In referring to such relations, the term algebraic tolerance or the term algebraic tolerance relation is used.
Transitive tolerance relations are equivalence relations. A set  together with a tolerance  is called a tolerance space (denoted ). A set  is a -preclass (or briefly preclass when  is understood) if and only if for any , .

The family of all preclasses of a tolerance space is naturally ordered by set inclusion and preclasses that are maximal with respect to set inclusion are called -classes or just classes, when  is understood.

The work on similarity by Poincaré and Zeeman presage the introduction of near sets and research on similarity relations, e.g.,.  In science and engineering, tolerance near sets are a practical application of the study of sets that are near within some tolerance.  A tolerance  is directly related to the idea of closeness or resemblance (i.e., being within some tolerance) in comparing objects.
By way of application of Poincaré's approach in defining visual spaces and Zeeman's approach to tolerance relations, the basic idea is to compare objects such as image patches in the interior of digital images.

Examples 

Simple example

The following simple example demonstrates the construction of tolerance classes from real data.

{| class="wikitable" style="text-align:center; width:30%;" border="1"
|+ Sample perceptual system
! !!  !!  !!  !!  !!  !! !! 
|-
| || .4518 ||     || .6943 ||  ||  .4002 ||  || .6079
|-
| || .9166 ||     || .9246 ||  ||  .1910 ||  || .1869
|-
| || .1398 ||     || .3537 ||  ||  .7476 ||  || .8489
|-
| || .7972 ||     || .4722 ||  ||  .4990 ||  || .9170
|-
| || .6281 ||  || .4523 ||  ||  .6289 ||  || .7143
|}

Let a tolerance relation be defined as

Then, setting  gives the following tolerance classes:

Observe that each object in a tolerance class satisfies the condition , and that almost all of the objects appear in more than one class. Moreover, there would be twenty classes if the indiscernibility relation was used since there are no two objects with matching descriptions.

Image processing example

The following example provides an example based on digital images. Let a subimage be defined as a small subset of pixels belonging to a digital image such that the pixels contained in the subimage form a square. Then, let the sets  and  respectively represent the subimages obtained from two different images, and let . Finally, let the description of an object be given by the Green component in the RGB color model.  The next step is to find all the tolerance classes using the tolerance relation defined in the previous example. Using this information, tolerance classes can be formed containing objects that have similar (within some small ) values for the Green component in the RGB colour model. Furthermore, images that are near (similar) to each other should have tolerance classes divided among both images (instead of a tolerance classes contained solely in one of the images). For example, the  figure accompanying this example shows a subset of the tolerance classes obtained from two leaf images. In this figure, each tolerance class is assigned a separate colour. As can be seen, the two leaves share similar tolerance classes. This example highlights a need to measure the degree of nearness of two sets.

Nearness measure 

Further, assume  and let  denote the family of all classes in the space .

Let .  The distance  is defined by

where

The details concerning  are given in. The idea behind  is that sets that are similar should have a similar number of objects in each tolerance class. Furthermore, each ratio is weighted by the total size of the tolerance class (thus giving importance to the larger classes) and the final result is normalized by dividing by the sum of all the cardinalities.

Each colour in the figures corresponds to a set where all the objects in the class share the same description. The idea behind  is that the nearness of sets in a perceptual system is based on the cardinality of tolerance classes that they share. Thus, the sets in left side of the figure are closer (more near) to each other in terms of their descriptions than the sets in right side of the figure.

Near set evaluation and recognition (NEAR) system 

The Near set Evaluation and Recognition (NEAR) system, is a system developed to demonstrate practical applications of near set theory to the problems of image segmentation evaluation and image correspondence. It was motivated by a need for a freely available software tool that can provide results for research and to generate interest in near set theory. The system implements a Multiple Document Interface (MDI) where each separate processing task is performed in its own child frame. The objects (in the near set sense) in this system are subimages of the images being processed and the probe functions (features) are image processing functions defined on the subimages. The system was written in C++ and was designed to facilitate the addition of new processing tasks and probe functions. Currently, the system performs six major tasks, namely, displaying equivalence and tolerance classes for an image, performing segmentation evaluation, measuring the nearness of two images, performing Content Based Image Retrieval (CBIR), and displaying the output of processing an image using a specific probe function.

Proximity System 

The Proximity System is an application developed to demonstrate descriptive-based topological approaches to nearness and proximity within the context of digital image analysis. The Proximity System grew out of the work of S. Naimpally and J. Peters on Topological Spaces. The Proximity System was written in Java and is intended to run in two different operating environments, namely on Android smartphones and tablets, as well as desktop platforms running the Java Virtual Machine. With respect to the desktop environment, the Proximity System is a cross-platform Java application for Windows, OSX, and Linux systems, which has been tested on Windows 7 and Debian Linux using the Sun Java 6 Runtime. In terms of the implementation of the theoretical approaches, both the Android and the desktop based applications use the same back-end libraries to perform the description-based calculations, where the only differences are the user interface and the Android version has less available features due to restrictions on system resources.

See also 

 Alternative set theory
 Category:Mathematical relations
 Category:Topology
 Feature vector
 Proximity space
 Rough set
 Topology

Notes

References

Further reading

 
 
 
 
 
 

Abstract algebra
Mathematical relations
Systems of set theory
Topology